Arthur Marsden (1883 – 26 November 1960) was a Royal Navy officer who became a British Conservative Party politician. He served as a Member of Parliament (MP) from 1931 to 1935 and from 1937 to 1950.

Naval career
Marsden was made a Royal Navy Sub-lieutenant on 15 November 1902 and was promoted to Lieutenant on 31 August 1904. The   sank Ardent, but Marsden was commended for his service in the battle. Later Marsden was promoted to Captain, and on 5 October 1920 he transferred to the Royal Navy Retired List.

Political career
Marsden first stood for election to the House of Commons at the 1929 general election, when he unsuccessfully contested the Communist-held Northern division of Battersea. In a four-way contest, the seat was won by the William Sanders of the Labour Party, and when Labour's vote collapsed at the 1931 general election, Marsden won the seat from Sanders.

Sanders regained the seat at the 1935 general election, but Marsden returned to Parliament two years later when he won a by-election in July 1937 in the safely-Conservative Chertsey division of Surrey.  He held the seat until he retired from the Commons at the 1950 general election.

References

External links
 

1883 births
1960 deaths
Royal Navy officers of World War I
Conservative Party (UK) MPs for English constituencies
UK MPs 1931–1935
UK MPs 1935–1945
UK MPs 1945–1950